Dokorder was a brand of tape recorder from Japanese electronics company , located in Ōta, Tokyo (not related to the Onkyo audio company of Osaka, neither to Denon) that included a four-reel transport system called "Dub-A-Tape" capable of feeding two different tapes through the same tape head assembly and, in the process, recording a duplicate of a tape.  (The master and blank tapes passed through the same capstan, but through different tape head areas, yielding a Y-shaped tape path reflected in the slots built into the head assembly. Denki Onkyo also supplied a consumer and semi-pro line of reel to reel recorders (including 4 track multitracks) that competed with Tascam/Teac and Sony but ultimately its products were found to be less durable than the competition.

Dokorder sold many different reel to reel tape recorders including 2 and 4 track recorders, some took 10.5" reels. The model 1120 was a popular 2 channel recorder in the 1970's.

In 1982, Murata Manufacturing acquired 55% shares of Denki Onkyo, and in 1999, the company has been fully merged into Murata.
In the mid 1960s Dokorder manufactured the 800 series Concertone tape recorders and decks.

Electronics companies of Japan
Defunct companies of Japan
Consumer electronics